Frederick Christian of Brandenburg-Bayreuth (17 July 1708 in Weferlingen – 20 January 1769 in Bayreuth), was a member of the House of Hohenzollern and Margrave of Brandenburg-Bayreuth.

Family
He was the youngest of fourteen children born to Margrave Christian Heinrich of Brandenburg-Bayreuth-Kulmbach by his wife, Countess Sophie Christiane of Wolfstein. His father died on 5 April 1708, almost three months before his birth.

Besides him, only six of his siblings survived to adulthood: Georg Frederick Karl, who became Margrave of Bayreuth; Albrecht Wolfgang, who was killed in battle in 1734; Dorothea Charlotte, Countess of Hohenlohe-Weikersheim, who died in 1712 after only seven months of marriage; Sophie Magdalene, Queen of Denmark; Frederick Ernst; and Sophie Caroline, Princess of Ostfriesland.

Life
Frederick Christian was considered an eccentric, indeed the "black sheep" of the family. By the time of the death of his cousin Georg Wilhelm, Margrave of Bayreuth (1726), he lived as a Danish Lieutenant-general in Wandsbek near Hamburg and was not prepared for any government tasks in the principality of Bayreuth. He did not exercise his power and left all the control of the principality to his older brother George Frederick Charles.

The death of his nephew Frederick without male issue on (26 February 1763), however, found him the only male member of the Bayreuth branch of the family, and, in consequence, the new Margrave of Bayreuth.

After his assumption of the government in Bayreuth, Frederick Christian tried to stabilize the ruined state finances by drastically reducing the costs of the Bayreuth court. Most artists who had worked there (among others, Carl von Gontard) went to Berlin to the court of King Frederick the Great. Almost all construction work in the castles and gardens were stopped. Bayreuth sank again into the Provinzialität (Province state).

Marriage and issue
In Schaumburg an der Lahn on 26 April 1732, Frederick Christian married Victoria Charlotte of Anhalt-Zeitz-Hoym (September 25, 1715 – February 4, 1772). They had two daughters:
Christiane Sophie Charlotte (b. Neustadt am Aisch, 15 October 1733 – d. Seidingstadt, 8 October 1757), married on 20 January 1757 to Ernst Frederick III, Duke of Saxe-Hildburghausen.
Sophie Magdalene (b. Neustadt am Aisch, 12 January 1737 – d. Neustadt am Aisch, 23 July 1737).

Christiane, Frederick Christian and Victoria Charlotte's only surviving daughter, died four days after giving birth to a daughter, who only survived her mother by nine days. This tragedy led to the complete breakdown of the couple's marriage, which never recovered from the loss.

Seven years later and shortly after Frederick Christian inherited the margraviate of Bayreuth (1764), he and Victoria Charlotte were divorced. Victoria Charlotte returned to her homeland, where she died in 1792, twenty-three years after her former husband. Neither of them remarried.

Without male issue, Frederick Christian became the last member of the Younger line of Brandenburg-Bayreuth, which had ruled this principality since 1603. On his death, Bayreuth was inherited by his distant kinsman, Charles Alexander, Margrave of Brandenburg-Ansbach.

Ancestry

References

External links 

1708 births
1769 deaths
Margraves of Bayreuth
House of Hohenzollern
Recipients of the Order of the White Eagle (Poland)